Bibby Point is a steep rocky headland with snow slopes falling away inland, at the northeast corner of Brandy Bay, James Ross Island. It was named by the UK Antarctic Place-Names Committee for John S. Bibby, Falkland Islands Dependencies Survey geologist at Hope Bay, 1958–59.

References
 

Headlands of James Ross Island